Eshkik (also Romanized as Eshkīk and Ashkīk; also known as Ishkik) is a village in Chukam Rural District, Khomam District, Rasht County, Gilan Province, Iran. At the 2006 census, its population was 1,905, in 528 families.

References 

Populated places in Rasht County